Herbert Arthur Jones was Dean of Manchester in the third quarter of the 20th century.

Born in 1887 he was educated at Birmingham University. He was ordained in 1917 and began his career with curacies at St Paul's Church, Balsall Heath and St Agatha's Church, Sparkbrook. He was then Vicar of All Saints' Small Heath after that Provost of Leicester Cathedral before entering the Deanery. He died on 17 February 1969.

Notes

1887 births
Alumni of the University of Birmingham
Provosts and Deans of Leicester
Deans of Manchester
1969 deaths